Hydrotaea houghi is a species of house flies, etc. in the family Muscidae from North America.

References

Muscidae
Diptera of North America
Insects described in 1916
Taxa named by John Russell Malloch
Articles created by Qbugbot